Cicindela theatina, commonly known as the Great Sand Dunes tiger beetle, is a predatory beetle found in sparsely vegetated sandy habitats. Despite its small range, the species is relatively secure because its entire habitat is within a protected national park.

The insects live for approximately 2.5 years, with mating occurring in late May and larvae appearing the next month. The larval stage lasts a little more than a year, with adults emerging the next July.

References

theatina
Beetles described in 1944
Beetles of the United States